The 1906 Westbury by-election was a parliamentary by-election held for the House of Commons constituency of Westbury in Wiltshire on 26 February 1906.

Vacancy
The by-election was caused by the resignation of the sitting Liberal MP, John Fuller. Fuller had been appointed a Lord Commissioner of the Treasury, one of the formal titles held by government Whips  and under the Parliamentary rules of the day had to resign and fight a by-election.

Candidates
Fuller had been MP for Westbury since the general election of 1900 and had held the seat with a majority of 1,476 votes or 16.4% of the poll at the 1906 election just a month earlier. In all the circumstances, the Conservatives declined to stand a candidate against him.

The result
There being no other candidates putting themselves forward Fuller was returned unopposed. He held his seat until 1911 when he resigned to take up appointment as Governor of Victoria in Australia.

See also
List of United Kingdom by-elections 
United Kingdom by-election records
1911 Westbury by-election

References

1906 elections in the United Kingdom
1906 in England
20th century in Wiltshire
February 1906 events
By-elections to the Parliament of the United Kingdom in Wiltshire constituencies
Unopposed ministerial by-elections to the Parliament of the United Kingdom in English constituencies